The Blue Humans is the name used by experimental guitarist Rudolph Grey for the improvised performances he leads with a variety of other musicians. Grey first came to notice in the late-1970s New York City post punk and art scene which also produced Sonic Youth and Swans, and played in the influential no wave band Mars. Since then, he has released solo material as well as several Blue Humans records, the latter mostly live recordings. Blue Humans members and collaborators have included Tom Surgal, Arthur Doyle, Beaver Harris, Alan Licht, Charles Gayle, and Thurston Moore.

Blue Humans lineups are often trios, sometimes two guitars and drums, sometimes guitar-sax-drums. Their sound is fast-moving, noisy, and aggressively atonal, although on longer pieces such as the 20-minute title track of Clear to Higher Time, they can produce a precisely-controlled build of tension.

Discography

References

External links 
 [ The Blue Humans bio in allmusic.com]

Free improvisation ensembles
Experimental musical groups
Noise musical groups
Blast First artists